Fameck is a commune in the Moselle department in Grand Est in north-eastern France.

Localities of the commune: Budange (a.k.a. Budange sous Justemont) and in German: Büdingen unter Justberg, Edange (German: Edingen), Morlange (German: Morlingen), Rémelange (German: Remelingen).

Population

See also
 Communes of the Moselle department

References

External links
 

Communes of Moselle (department)
Duchy of Bar